A by-election was held for the New South Wales Legislative Assembly electorate of the Clarence on 27 August 1866 following the resignation of John Laycock.

Dates

Candidates
 John Robertson had been appointed Secretary for Lands but had been defeated at the resulting 1866 West Sydney by-election.

 Alexander MacKellar had been the second placed candidate at the 1859 election for The Clarence receiving 30.3% of the vote.

Results

John Laycock resigned.

See also
Electoral results for the district of Clarence
List of New South Wales state by-elections

References

1866 elections in Australia
New South Wales state by-elections
1860s in New South Wales